The Sherry River is a river in New Zealand's Tasman Region. It flows north from its origins in the Hope Range to meet the Wangapeka River eight kilometres from the latter's outflow into the Motueka River.

See also
List of rivers of New Zealand

References

Rivers of the Tasman District
Rivers of New Zealand